The name John has been used for eight tropical cyclones in the Eastern Pacific Ocean and two tropical cyclones in the Southern Hemisphere.

In the Eastern Pacific 
 Hurricane John (1978), a Category 2 hurricane, did not affect land.
 Hurricane John (1982), a Category 3 hurricane, which never made landfall.
 Tropical Storm John (1988), affected the southern tip of Baja California.
 Hurricane John (1994) (T9420, 10E), a powerful Category 5 hurricane, formed near Mexico, crossed the international date line becoming Typhoon John, then crossed back. Second longest lasting tropical cyclone in recorded history.
 Tropical Storm John (2000), did not affect land.
 Hurricane John (2006), a large Category 4 hurricane that made landfall on Baja California.
 Tropical Storm John (2012), a short-lived tropical storm, did not affect land.
 Hurricane John (2018), a Category 2 hurricane that brushed Baja California without making landfall.

In the Southern Hemisphere 
 Cyclone John (1989), affected Cocos Island as it was developing
 Cyclone John (1999), made landfall between Port Hedland and Karratha in Western Australia

Pacific hurricane set index articles
Pacific typhoon set index articles
Australian region cyclone set index articles